The Wesseler W 17 is an agricultural tractor made by H. Wesseler OHG. It is the firm's smallest two-cylinder model and was made from 1954 until 1956. In the Netherlands, the tractor was sold under the Vewema brand.

Technical description 

The W 17 is based on a frameless design with the rear axle and front axle assembly directly flange-mounted to the engine. The rear axle is a ZF A-5/5 (or ZF A-5/6) transmission unit consisting of a portal axle and a constant-mesh gearbox with either five or six forward gears, and a regular reverse gear. The six-speed versions of the gearbox have an additional 1.5 km/h crawler gear below first gear, but are otherwise identical to the five-speed units, i.e. they have the same gearing and thus offer the exact same speeds. Since there is no drive shaft to the front axle, all W 17 tractors are rear-wheel drive only. The front axle is an unsprung stub axle with a central longitudinal pivot point. In front, the tractor has 4.5–16 inch tyres, in back it has 7–24 inch tyres. The rear wheels are fitted with mechanically operated duplex drum brakes.

Wessler installed an MWM KD 211 Z industrial Diesel engine in the W 17. The water pump is flange-mounted to the head and driven by a belt from the engine's crankshaft. The engine can be hand-cranked.

References 

Tractors